A list of power generating stations operated by the Tennessee Valley Authority:

Dams and hydroelectric facilities 

 Apalachia Dam
 Bear Creek Dam
 Beaver Creek Dam
 Beech Dam
 Blue Ridge Dam
 Boone Dam
 Cedar Dam
 Cedar Creek Dam
 Chatuge Dam
 Cherokee Dam
 Chickamauga Dam
 Clear Creek Dam
 Dogwood Dam
 Douglas Dam
 Fontana Dam
 Fort Loudoun Dam
 Fort Patrick Henry Dam
 Great Falls Dam
 Guntersville Dam
 Hiwassee Dam
 Kentucky Dam
 Little Bear Creek Dam
 Lost Creek Dam
 Melton Hill Dam
 Nickajack Dam
 Nolichucky Dam
 Normandy Dam
 Norris Dam
 Nottely Dam
 Ocoee Dams 1, 2, 3
 Pickwick Landing Dam
 Pin Oak Dam
 Pine Dam
 Raccoon Mountain Pumped-Storage Plant
 Redbud Dam
 South Holston Dam
 Sycamore Dam
 Tellico Dam
 Tims Ford Dam
 Upper Bear Creek Dam
 Watauga Dam
 Watts Bar Dam
 Wheeler Dam
 Wilbur Dam
 Wilson Dam

Fossil fuel plants

Nuclear power plants

Joint facilities 
TVA also assists ALCOA's Tapoco/APGI in regulating several facilities, including the Calderwood, Cheoah, Chilhowee, and Santeetlah dams.

Renewable generation 
TVA operates several small-scale facilities that generate electricity from renewable sources other than hydropower. These include:
Solar electric generation
 Lovers Lane soccer complex, Bowling Green, Kentucky (36 kW capacity)
 Finley Stadium, Chattanooga, Tennessee (85 kW)
 Gibson County High School, Dyer, Tennessee (18 kW)
 Florence, Alabama water treatment facility (30 kW)
 Sci-Quest science museum, Huntsville, Alabama (27 kW)
 Ijams Nature Center, Knoxville, Tennessee (15 kW)
 Bridges Center, Memphis, Tennessee (25 kW)
 Adventure Science Center, Nashville, Tennessee (27 kW)
 Cocke County High School, Newport, Tennessee (9 kW)
 American Museum of Science and Energy, Oak Ridge, Tennessee (15 kW)
 Oak Ridge National Laboratory, Oak Ridge, Tennessee (7 kW)
 University of Mississippi, University, Mississippi (30 kW)
 Dollywood in Pigeon Forge, Tennessee (two 18 kW facilities)
 Duffield-Pattonsville Elementary School, Scott County, Virginia (9 kW)
 Mississippi State University, Mississippi State, Mississippi (15 kW)
Wind power
At Buffalo Mountain in Oliver Springs, Tennessee, TVA operates three wind turbines with a combined generation capacity of 2 MW and purchases the output of 15 additional wind turbines owned by Invenergy that have a combined capacity of 27 MW. As of 2013, the agency had purchased agreements from power generated from wind farms outside its service area:
2012 – Enel Green Power, LLC – 201MW – Caney River Wind Farm, Elk County, Kansas.
2012 – Invenergy – 400MW – Bishop Hill Wind Energy Center, Henry County, Illinois
2012 – 200MW – California Ridge Wind Energy Center in Champaign County, Illinois  
2012 – NextEra Energy Resources – 150MW – White Oak Energy Center, McLean County, Illinois 
2012 – NextEra Energy Resources – 165MW – Cimarron Wind farm, Gray County, Kansas 
A 2010 agreement with Iberdrola Renewables provides a potential 300MW future supply from Streator-Cayuga Ridge Wind Farm, Livingston County, Illinois

Waste-derived methane 
Biogas from the Maxson wastewater treatment plant in Memphis is burned in Allen Fossil Plant, accounting for a generating capacity of 4 MW.

Former facilities

Cancelled facilities

See also
List of power stations in Tennessee
List of power stations in North Carolina
List of power stations in Georgia (U.S. state)
List of power stations in Alabama
List of power stations in Kentucky
List of power stations in Virginia

References

 
TVA